Mėnuo Juodaragis ( or Moon of the Black Horn, sometimes abbreviated as BHM (MJR)) is an annual Baltic culture, alternative music, folk music and experimental music festival organized in Lithuania. It has been running since 1995 and is visited by 5,000 to 6,000 people each year, making it one of the biggest and oldest festivals in Lithuania.

The festival's programme includes lectures by folklorists and historians, workshops and demonstrations by artisans (blacksmiths, leatherworkers, weavers, jewellers, dyers and others), traditional rites, historical reenactments, art exhibitions, film screenings, hikes, sports competitions and folk dancing.

History

The festival was initiated in 1997 as a spontaneous one-day gathering of several young people and their friends in Verbiškės village, Molėtai District, Lithuania, where it was organized biennially until 1999.

The festival later moved to Sudeikiai, a settlement near Utena town, where it took place from 2000 to 2002. Since then the timing of the festival also became fixed on the last weekend of August. Then in 2003–2005, Mėnuo Juodaragis was held in Kernavė, the medieval capital of the Grand Duchy of Lithuania. After a break in 2006 for financial and organisational reasons, the festival chose an island in Zarasas Lake in Zarasai town as the location for the 2007 festival.

In 2011 Mėnuo Juodaragis returned to Lake Zarasas and the 12th festival was dedicated to sutartinės, Lithuanian ancient polyphonic singing. The theme of the 13th festival in 2012 was birds and aviation and it was once again organized in Lake Zarasas. An air balloon race was held during the festival, as well as a nighttime balloon parade.

The 14th Mėnuo Juodaragis was dedicated to Latvians, the other surviving Baltic people, and the unity of Baltic people, featuring an extensive list of Latvian bands, such as Iļģi, Auļi, Skyforger, Vilki, Grodi and Dzelzs Vilks, as well as Latvian artisans and lecturers.

The main theme of the 19th festival in 2016 was "Home", according to the organizers not only in the physical sense but also in a spiritual meaning. That year Mėnuo Juodaragis took place on an island in Dūburys Lake, Zarasai District and the headliner was Slovenian avant-garde music group Laibach.

The 20th edition of Mėnuo Juodaragis returned to the island in Dūburys Lake. The festival was dedicated to Baltic god of thunder Perkūnas and was headlined by Nordic folk music group Wardruna.

The 21st edition of Mėnuo Juodaragis in 2018 took place at the complex of Molavėnai Castle Mounds. In early 2019 the organizers announced an interlude and that the next festival will be held from 27 to 30 of August 2020.

Organisers and supporters
Mėnuo Juodaragis is organised by the Lithuanian record label  and non-profit public institution "Baltijos Griaustinis". Since 2002, the festival is partially supported by the Ministry of Culture of the Republic of Lithuania, as well as the Department of UNESCO Cultural Management at Vilnius Academy of Arts, other cultural institutions, enterprises, media channels, and private persons.

List of festivals

References

External links

Official Mėnuo Juodaragis website 
Official Mėnuo Juodaragis YouTube channel
Povilas Vaitkevičius (January–December 2015). The Black-Horned Moon Festival: Change is Life . World New Music Magazine (No. 18). Music Information Centre Lithuania.

Folk festivals in Lithuania
Experimental music festivals
Neofolk
Recurring events established in 1995
1995 establishments in Lithuania
Annual events in Lithuania
Modern paganism in Lithuania
Modern pagan music festivals